Tarbiṣu (modern Sherif Khan, Ninawa Governorate, Iraq) was an ancient city about 3 miles north of Nineveh.

History
Tarbiṣu was a minor town until the control of the Assyrian Empire was moved to
nearby Nineveh by Sennacherib. Two palaces were built there, one by Esarhaddon
for his son and crown prince, Ashurbanipal. Two temples were found at the site,
one being the temple of Nergal, constructed by Sennacherib, and
added to by Ashurbanipal. One of the gates in the northwest wall of Nineveh was named for Nergal and the road from that gate to Tarbiṣu was paved completely in stone by Sennacherib.

Tarbiṣu was captured by the Medes, led by Cyaxares in the 12th year of Nabopolassar, king of Babylon
and faded along with the Assyrian Empire.

Archaeology

Tarbiṣu was excavated by Austen Henry Layard, and then Sir Henry Rawlinson
under the auspices of the British Museum in the mid-19th century.

Notes

See also

Cities of the ancient Near East
Short chronology timeline

References

A Sulaiman, Discovery of the Assyrian City of Tarbisu, Adab al-Rafidain, vol. 2, pp. 15–49, 1971 (Arabic)
J. E. Curtis, A. K. Grayson, Some Inscribed Objects from Sherif Khan in the British Museum, vol. 44, no. 1, pp. 87–94, 1982

External links
Fall of Nineveh Chronicle - Livius.org
Cylinder Seal from Tarbisu - British Museum

Archaeological sites in Iraq
Former populated places in Iraq